The list of ship commissionings in 1961 includes a chronological list of all ships commissioned in 1961.


See also 

1961
 Ship commissionings